Gibbafroneta is a monotypic genus of Central African dwarf spiders containing the single species, Gibbafroneta gibbosa. It was first described by P. Merrett in 2004, and has only been found in Middle Africa.

See also
 List of Linyphiidae species (A–H)

References

Linyphiidae
Monotypic Araneomorphae genera
Spiders of Africa